This article lists diplomatic missions resident in Finland. At present, the capital Helsinki hosts 62 embassies. Several other countries accredit ambassadors from other regional capitals, such as Oslo, Stockholm, London, Paris, Berlin, Brussels, Copenhagen and Moscow. Honorary consulates are excluded from this listing.

Diplomatic missions in Helsinki

Consulates in Finland

Non-resident embassies

Stockholm

London

Berlin

Brussels

Copenhagen

Moscow

Other cities

Former embassies 
 
  (closed in 1998)
 
  (closed in 2012)
  (closed in 2021)

See also 
 Foreign relations of Finland
 Visa requirements for Finnish citizens

Notes

References

External links 
 Missions in Finland

Diplomatic missions
Finland